Kishwaukee is an unincorporated community in Winnebago County, in the U.S. state of Illinois.

History
A post office called Kishwaukee was established in 1838, and remained in operation until it was discontinued in 1905. Kishwaukee is derived from a Native American language meaning "sycamore tree."

References

Unincorporated communities in Winnebago County, Illinois
Unincorporated communities in Illinois